This list is of the Cultural Properties of Japan designated in the category of  for the Prefecture of '''Aomori.

National Cultural Properties
As of 1 July 2019, zero properties have been designated as being of national significance.

Prefectural Cultural Properties
As of 26 March 2019, six properties have been designated at a prefectural level.

See also
 Cultural Properties of Japan
 Japanese painting
 List of Historic Sites of Japan (Aomori)
 Aomori Prefectural Museum

References

External links
  Cultural Properties in Aomori Prefecture

Cultural Properties,Aomori
Cultural Properties,Paintings
Paintings,Aomori
Lists of paintings